The 1982 Mr. Olympia contest was an IFBB professional bodybuilding competition held in October 1982 at the Wembley Conference Centre in London, England.

Results
Total prize money awarded was $25,000.

Notable events
Chris Dickerson became the first openly gay and oldest competitor up to that time to win the Mr. Olympia title at 43 years old.
Franco Columbu, the 1981 champion did not compete.
Tom Platz, who was favored, tore his right biceps 6 weeks prior to the competition and competed after having it surgically repaired.
Chris Dickerson on stage would announce his retirement thus marking his final on stage appearance.

References

External links 
 Mr. Olympia

 1982
1982 in English sport
1982 in bodybuilding
Bodybuilding competitions in the United Kingdom
1982 sports events in London
Sports competitions in London